Wilhelm Trautmann (6 December 1888 – 24 July 1969) was a German international footballer.

He played for Viktoria Mannheim and later for VfR Mannheim.

References

1888 births
1969 deaths
Association football midfielders
German footballers
Germany international footballers